John Earl Reid (born May 15, 1996) is an American football cornerback for the Atlanta Falcons of the National Football League (NFL). He played college football at Penn State.

Early life and high school career
A native of Mount Laurel, New Jersey, he played high school football at St. Joseph's Prep in Philadelphia where he was a three-year starter.

College career
Reid attended the Pennsylvania State University. He started two games as a true freshman and played in 13 games, earning ESPN.com's Big Ten All-Freshman team honors. He started all 14 games in 2016 as a sophomore, helping Penn State win a Big Ten Championship and make a trip to the Rose Bowl. Reid redshirted the 2017 season due to a knee injury. He started 24 games in his final two years as a Nittany Lion. He finished third on the team with 72 tackles as a senior. In his career, Reid had 125 total tackles and seven interceptions. He was a three-time Big Ten Honorable Mention. Aside from football, Reid majored in electrical engineering and computer science, where he had internships at Intel and Blizzard Entertainment.

Professional career

Houston Texans
Reid was selected by the Houston Texans in the fourth round with the 141st pick of the 2020 NFL Draft.

Seattle Seahawks
On August 24, 2021, the Texans traded Reid to the Seattle Seahawks for a 2022 seventh round draft pick. He was waived on August 31, 2021, re-signed to the practice squad the next day and one week later joined the 53-man roster. He was released on October 12 2022.

Atlanta Falcons
On November 22, 2022, Reid signed with the practice squad of the Atlanta Falcons.

Tennessee Titans
On December 7, 2022, Reid was signed by the Tennessee Titans off the Falcons practice squad. He was waived on December 30.

Atlanta Falcons (second stint)
On January 3, 2023, Reid was signed to the Atlanta Falcons practice squad. He signed a reserve/future contract on January 9, 2023.

References

External links
Penn State Nittany Lions bio

1996 births
Living people
People from Mount Laurel, New Jersey
Players of American football from New Jersey
Sportspeople from Burlington County, New Jersey
American football cornerbacks
Penn State Nittany Lions football players
Houston Texans players
Seattle Seahawks players
Atlanta Falcons players
Tennessee Titans players